The 1990 French motorcycle Grand Prix was the tenth round of the 1990 Grand Prix motorcycle racing season. It took place on the weekend of 20–22 July 1990 at the Bugatti Circuit located in Le Mans.

500 cc race report
Kevin Schwantz on pole and race day is hot and sunny.

Wayne Rainey wheelies halfway down the straight, giving the first turn to Wayne Gardner, then it’s Mick Doohan in third place.

Gardner goes very wide on a turn and has to sit up, letting Rainey through and when he gets back on the racing line, he forces Doohan wide as well.

It’s still a tight race at the front between Rainey, Gardner, Schwantz, Doohan, Eddie Lawson and Christian Sarron.

Gardner takes Rainey on the straight, and in the same place Gardner went wide, Rainey goes a little off-line too, this time letting Schwantz through into second.

At La Chapelle Gardner goes wide again, and Schwantz takes the lead easily.

By the last lap, Schwantz has a good gap in first, followed by Gardner and Rainey.

500 cc classification

References

French motorcycle Grand Prix
French
Motorcycle Grand Prix